St Edmund's College Boat Club (SECBC) is the boat club for members of St Edmund's College, Cambridge, England. St Edmund's College is a constituent college of the University of Cambridge in England. The boat club has considerable successful in recent years, for which its men's first boat (M1) has continually bumped in both Lent and May Bumps races.

SECBC was founded in the 1970s and uses the Cambridge '99 RC boathouse for training and storing its boats. The club has two boats: 'Lily', a men's eight and 'Dotty', a women's eight.

History

References

External links
 St Edmund's College Boat Club

Rowing clubs of the University of Cambridge
Boat club
Rowing clubs in Cambridgeshire
Rowing clubs in England
Rowing clubs of the River Cam